The University of Stuttgart is a leading research university located in Stuttgart, Germany. It was founded in 1829 and is organized into 10 faculties. It is one of the oldest technical universities in Germany with highly ranked programs in civil, mechanical, industrial and electrical engineering, among others. It is a member of TU9, an incorporated society of the largest and most notable German institutes of technology. The university is especially known for its reputation in the fields of advanced automotive engineering, efficient industrial and automated manufacturing, process engineering, aerospace engineering and activity-based costing.

History

From 1770 to 1794, the Karlsschule was the first university in Stuttgart. Located in Stuttgart-Hohenheim, it has since 1818 been the University of Hohenheim and is not related to the University of Stuttgart, except for some joint activities.

What is now the University of Stuttgart was founded in 1829, and celebrated its 175th anniversary in 2004. Because of the increasing importance of the technical sciences and instruction in these fields, from 1876 the university was known as the Technische Hochschule Stuttgart (Stuttgart Institute of Technology). In 1900 it was awarded the right to grant doctoral degrees in the technical disciplines. The development of the courses of study at the Technische Hochschule Stuttgart led to its renaming in 1967 to the present-day "Universität Stuttgart". With this change of name came along a built-up of new fields, such as history of science and technology and the social sciences, and the extension of existing ones, such as history and art history.

Since the end of the 1950s, a part of the university has been located in the suburb of Stuttgart-Vaihingen. Most technical subjects (computer science, engineering, etc.) are located in Vaihingen, while the humanities, the social sciences, architecture, and similar topics are still located in the city center campus. The university hosts many national and international research institutes, and collaborates with partners such as Fraunhofer, German Aerospace Center, among others. The university is also founding member of the Startup Autobahn as well as Arena2036, the flexible research factory.

Organization
The university is divided into 10 faculties:

Faculty of Architecture and Urban Planning
Faculty of Civil- and Environmental Engineering
Faculty of Chemistry
Faculty of Energy-, Process- and Bio-Engineering
Faculty of Computer Science, Electrical Engineering and Information Technology
Faculty of Aerospace Engineering and Geodesy
Faculty of Engineering Design, Production Engineering and Automotive Engineering
Faculty of Mathematics and Physics
Faculty of Humanities
Faculty of Management, Economics and Social Sciences

Ranking and reputation

Universität Stuttgart is consistently ranked among the world's top universities in various international ranking surveys such as the Academic Ranking of World Universities and the Times Higher Education Supplement which ranks over 1000 universities worldwide. As of 2017, University of Stuttgart is ranked 79th in the world in the field of Engineering & Technology according to QS World University Rankings. University of Stuttgart is one of the best universities in the fields of mechanical, aeronautical, and manufacturing engineering (42nd worldwide and 3rd best in Germany) and has been ranked several times as one of the best engineering universities in Germany.

Notable alumni
Gustav Bauernfeind, painter, illustrator and architect
Volker Beck
Günter Behnisch, architect
Gunnar Birkerts, architect
Kim Bui, Artistic gymnast, member of 2012, 2016, and 2020 German Olympic teams 
Gottlieb Daimler, engineer: The Inventor of "The Automobile" and co-founder (together with Carl Benz) of Mercedes-Benz
Gerhard Ertl, Nobel Prize Laureate in Chemistry in 2007
Hartmut Esslinger, Industry Designer, Apple Macintosh, Lufthansa, Windows XP, SAP Designer
Max Eyth
Gego
Rudolf Haag, physicist
Ernst Heinkel
Rolf-Dieter Heuer
Martin Jetter, CEO of IBM Deutschland GmbH and IBM Japan, Ltd.
Wunibald Kamm
Heinz-Hermann Koelle
Berthold Leibinger
Fritz Leonhardt
Michael Macht, former CEO of Porsche AG
Wilhelm Maybach, engineer and automobile designer
Ulf Merbold
Frieder Nake
Achilles Papapetrou
Karl Ramsayer, geodesist, pioneer of global and German flight navigation
Ulrich Spiesshofer, former CEO of ABB Group 
Horst Störmer, physicist, Nobel prize winner
Fredrick Töben
Martin Winterkorn, former CEO of Volkswagen AG
Franz Xaver Wortmann, aerodynamicist and professor
Yajin Zhang, architect, general director at the Beijing Branch of ISA Internationales Stadtbauatelier

See also

 List of early modern universities in Europe
 Top Industrial Managers for Europe
 Forschungsinstitut für Kraftfahrwesen und Fahrzeugmotoren Stuttgart

Notes and references

External links

 University of Stuttgart Website
 Partnership with The German University in Cairo

 
Educational institutions established in 1829
Engineering universities and colleges in Germany
1829 establishments in Germany
19th-century establishments in Württemberg
Universities and colleges in Baden-Württemberg